Benjamin Thomas Ford  (born 1 April 1925) is a British former Labour politician who was the Member of Parliament for Bradford North from 1964 to 1983.

Early years
Born to parents Benjamin Charles Ford and May Ethel (née Moorton), Ford's address at the time of his birth was 67 Haberdasher Street, Shoreditch, County of London. He moved to Streatham, SW16 in 1927. Ford attended Rowan Road Central School in Surrey. From 1951 to 1964, he worked as an electronic fitter-wireman.

Political career 
Ford was councillor on Clacton Urban District Council from 1959 to 1962, and an alderman of Essex County Council from 1959 to 1965. Ford was election agent for Harwich in 1959, and president of that Constituency Labour Party from 1955 to 1963.

He was elected Labour Party Member of Parliament for Bradford North at the 1964 general election. Whilst an MP, he served as chairman of the All-Party Wool and Textile Group of MPs and was a founder member of The Manifesto Group (an alliance of Labour parliamentarians opposed to the party's perceived move to the left). In 1982, he was deselected as the Labour candidate in favour of Pat Wall, and subsequently stood at the 1983 general election as an independent Labour candidate. Ford polled 9% of the vote, which arguably split Labour support and helped the Conservative candidate Geoffrey Lawler to win. By the early 1990s, Ford had joined the Liberal Democrats.

Honours 
In 1979, Ford was made a Freeman of the City of London. From 1978 to 1999, he was a Liveryman of the Gunmakers' Company. In 1982, he became a deputy lieutenant of West Yorkshire. He became an Honorary Fellow of the Association of International Accountants in 1983. In 1976, he was made a Grand Officer of the Order of the Southern Cross in Brazil.

Personal life
He married Vera Ada (née Fawcett-Fancet) in 1950, with whom he had three children: Anthony, Paula and Ivan. Outside of politics, he lists his recreations as music, shooting, family and reading. He lives in Bramhope, Leeds, and is a member of East Ward Labour Club in Bradford.

Publications 

 Piecework, 1960

References

External links 
 
Times Guide to the House of Commons, 1966 & 1983

1925 births
Living people
Amalgamated Engineering Union-sponsored MPs
Labour Party (UK) MPs for English constituencies
Independent politicians in England
UK MPs 1964–1966
UK MPs 1966–1970
UK MPs 1970–1974
UK MPs 1974
UK MPs 1974–1979
UK MPs 1979–1983
Politicians from Bradford
Councillors in Essex